William J. Knapp (August 21, 1888 – October 26, 1972) was an American thoroughbred horse racing Hall of Fame jockey. He was known for racing horses such as Exterminator and Sun Briar. He became the jockey for Exterminator in the 1918 Kentucky Derby. He was expecting to race Sun Briar, an extremely fast colt, but Sun Briar became ill and he had no choice but to race Exterminator, Sun Briar's training horse. However, Exterminator won the Derby and Knapp became his lifelong jockey.

Knapp is also well remembered as the jockey aboard the aptly named Upset on August 13, 1919 when he handed the legendary Man o' War his only defeat in the Sanford Memorial Stakes.

Among his many success as a jockey, during a period of less than a month in 1907 Knapp guided Charles Edward to three track records including a World record. In a 1910 history of the feat, the Daily Racing Form wrote that Charles Edward "gave in the Seagate one of the most amazing displays of high-class speed ever witnessed."

On September 27, 1914 Knapp married Elizabeth Blute, the daughter of trainer James Blute who was the 1907 United States Co-Champion Thoroughbred Trainer by wins tying with James G. Rowe Sr. and Frank Hanlon.

Willie Knapp died at age 84 on October 26, 1972 at the Long Island Jewish Hospital in New Hyde Park, New York.

References

1888 births
1972 deaths
American jockeys
American Champion jockeys
United States Thoroughbred Racing Hall of Fame inductees
Sportspeople from Chicago